Badra Ali Sangaré (born 30 May 1986) is an Ivorian professional footballer who plays as a goalkeeper for Sekhukhune and the Ivory Coast national team.

Club career
Born in Bingerville, Sangaré began to play for the Académie J-M Guillou before he his first professional contract with ES Bingerville in 2004. He joined Thai Premier League club Chonburi FC in 2006, where he played for one year. Sangaré then signed on 9 March 2007 with BEC Tero Sasana FC and left Thailand upon expiry of his contract on 29 December 2008. He signed with Olympic Charleroi in Belgium, but after a half a year signed for Séwé Sports de San Pedro in July 2009 .

International career
Sangaré's first call-up to the Ivory Coast national team was on 27 March 2009 against Malawi. Previously, he played with the Ivory Coast U-23 team at the 2008 Toulon Tournament and the UEMOA Tournament. He represented the Ivory Coast at the 2008 Summer Olympics in Beijing. He also played two African Cups of Nations.

References

External links
 
 

1986 births
Living people
People from Bingerville
Association football goalkeepers
Ivorian footballers
Ivorian Muslims
South African Premier Division players
National First Division players
Badra Ali Sangare
Ivory Coast international footballers
Badra Ali Sangare
ES Bingerville players
Séwé Sport de San-Pédro players
ASEC Mimosas players
Free State Stars F.C. players
Uthongathi F.C. players
JDR Stars F.C. players
2011 African Nations Championship players
2013 Africa Cup of Nations players
2017 Africa Cup of Nations players
2019 Africa Cup of Nations players
2021 Africa Cup of Nations players
Ivorian expatriate footballers
Ivorian expatriate sportspeople in Thailand
Ivorian expatriate sportspeople in Belgium
Ivorian expatriate sportspeople in South Africa
Expatriate footballers in Thailand
Expatriate footballers in Belgium
Expatriate soccer players in South Africa
Ivory Coast A' international footballers
2016 African Nations Championship players